The Annual Review of Economics is a peer-reviewed academic journal that publishes an annual volume of review articles relevant to economics. It was established in 2009 and is published by Annual Reviews. The co-editors are Philippe Aghion and Hélène Rey.

History
The Annual Review of Economics was first published in 2009 by the nonprofit publisher Annual Reviews. Its founding editors were Timothy Bresnahan and Nobel laureate Kenneth J. Arrow. As of 2021, it is published both in print and online.

Scope and indexing
The Annual Review of Economics defines its scope as covering significant developments in economics; specific subdisciplines included are macroeconomics; microeconomics; international, social, behavioral, cultural, institutional, education, and network economics; public finance; economic growth, economic development; political economy; game theory; and social choice theory. As of 2022, Journal Citation Reports lists the journal's impact factor as 5.970, ranking it thirty-ninth of 379 journals in the category "Economics".  It is abstracted and indexed in Scopus, Social Sciences Citation Index, ABI/INFORM, and EconLit, among others.

Editorial processes
The Annual Review of Economics is helmed by the editor or the co-editors. The editor is assisted by the editorial committee, which includes associate editors, regular members, and occasionally guest editors. Guest members participate at the invitation of the editor, and serve terms of one year. All other members of the editorial committee are appointed by the Annual Reviews board of directors and serve five-year terms. The editorial committee determines which topics should be included in each volume and solicits reviews from qualified authors. Unsolicited manuscripts are not accepted. Peer review of accepted manuscripts is undertaken by the editorial committee.

Editors of volumes
Dates indicate publication years in which someone was credited as a lead editor or co-editor of a journal volume. The planning process for a volume begins well before the volume appears, so appointment to the position of lead editor generally occurred prior to the first year shown here. An editor who has retired or died may be credited as a lead editor of a volume that they helped to plan, even if it is published after their retirement or death. 

 Kenneth J. Arrow and Timothy Bresnahan (2009–2017)
 Philippe Aghion (2018)
 Aghion and Hélène Rey (2019–present)

Current editorial board
As of 2022, the editorial committee consists of the two co-editors and the following members:

 Timothy Besley
 Hanming Fang
 Gene M. Grossman
 Muriel Niederle

See also
 Annual Review of Financial Economics
 List of economics journals

References 

 

Economics journals
Economics
Publications established in 2009
English-language journals
Annual journals